The Taishan Nuclear Power Plant is a nuclear power plant in Taishan, Guangdong province, China.
The plant features two operational EPR reactors.
The first unit, Taishan 1, entered commercial service in December 2018, but was shut down from July 2021 to August 2022 to investigate and fix issues with fuel rod cladding. The second unit, Taishan 2, entered commercial service in September 2019. Delays at other EPR construction sites in Finland and France meant that Taishan was the first nuclear power plant to have an operational EPR.

The project is owned by Guangdong Taishan Nuclear Power Joint Venture Company Limited (TNPC), which is 70% owned by China Guangdong Nuclear Power Group (CGNPC) and 30% by Électricité de France (EDF).

The plant's twin reactors each have a nameplate capacity 1750 MWe. Its Arabelle generators are the largest single-piece electrical generators in the world, each weighing 495 tonnes and built by Dongfang Electric.
Of the 3500 MWe gross delivered, around 180 MWe will be used by plant systems. Most of this is used to power the pumps that feed water into the steam generators. The pair of reactors can deliver 3320 MWe net for supply to the grid, making these the most powerful reactors in the world.

History

Construction
Excavation work began on August 26, 2008.
The first concrete for the first unit was poured in October 2009.
Construction of each unit was planned to take 46 months, significantly faster and cheaper than the first two EPRs in Finland and France. These plans proved elusive as start up was repeatedly delayed. In February 2017, after 88 months of construction, CGNPC announced that completion of the reactors would be delayed until the second half of 2017 and the first half of 2018.

Areva was contracted to develop the nuclear island (including reactor) and supply fuel for 15 years, as well as providing technology transfer and engineering services.

In December 2017, Hong Kong media reported that a boiler had cracked during testing, and that welding on the component was considered "problematic". Neither the nuclear plant's operators nor the manufacturer of the affected component responded to the news agency's request for comment. The boiler was later found to be a deaerator, which removes dissolved oxygen from water by heating it.

In January 2018 commissioning was rescheduled, with commercial operation expected in late 2018 and 2019. This was the third delay in two years, involving a further deferral of 5 billion yuan (US$770 million). It was estimated that the plant’s investment cost would rise to between 22 and 23 yuan per watt from an originally budgeted 14 yuan.

On April 9, 2018, the Official Letter of Approving the Initial Fuel Loading of the first unit of the Taishan Nuclear Power Plant was issued by the National Nuclear Safety Administration (NNSA). Taishan Unit 1 began fuel loading at 18:18 on April 10, marking the beginning of fuel loading of the first reactor using the third-generation nuclear power technology EPR.

Operations
First criticality was achieved at Taishan Unit 1 on June 6, 2018.
On June 29, 2018, Taishan 1 was connected to the grid.
It became the first EPR to enter commercial operation on December 13, 2018.

On March 2, 2021, the Chinese NNSA reported that a "level 0" incident occurred on February 21, which caused Unit 1 to SCRAM automatically. Post-accident investigation revealed the cause of the SCRAM to be a technician accidentally shorting a circuit during an onsite investigation of a slight under-voltage of a 10kV power supply. To prevent this accident from occurring in the future, all nuclear power plants were ordered to revise operating procedures to improve reliability and maintainability of similar power supplies.

On April 11, 2021, the Chinese NNSA reported that another level 0 incident occurred on April 5, resulting in the unexpected release of radioactive gas into the atmosphere. Post-accident investigation calculated the amount of radioactive release to contribute to 0.00044% of annual limit, well within safety parameters.

Leaks and Shutdown

On June 14, 2021, CNN reported that the Taishan Nuclear Power Plant had a suspected leak, based on a report by Framatome communicated to the United States on June 8, which read, in part, "The situation is an imminent radiological threat to the site and to the public and Framatome urgently requests permission to transfer technical data and assistance as may be necessary to return the plant to normal operation.". Said incident was the level 0 incident previously reported on April 11, 2021. Further details provided by Framatome revealed that the issue was build-up of xenon and krypton inert fission gases in the primary circuit of Taishan 1, potentially from a leak in a fuel rod housing. The build-up was described as "known phenomenon" which is well covered in the plant's operating and safety procedures.

On June 15, Japan reported that its radiation monitoring posts, the closest of which is at Yonaguni Island, did not measure any "abnormalities in data".

Li Ning, a nuclear scientist based in the United States, criticized CNN as "making a mountain out of a molehill", stating that it was unrealistic to expect "zero failure" in the fuel claddings at any nuclear reactor. Li also criticized the media for being "often unwilling to put risks into proper perspective", which according to Li, killed the Western nuclear industry, and stated that "Coal fired power plants can emit and discharge more radioactivity than nuclear power plants."

On June 16, 2021, the Ministry of Ecology and Environment released a conversation dialog with representatives from the NNSA. Five out of 60,000 fuel rods (0.01%) in reactor core 1 were estimated to be suffering from cladding defects. The ratio was well within design maximum fault rate of 0.25%. CGN stated there had been no release of radiation from the plant, and the small increase in the level of radioactivity was confined to the primary coolant circuit. After analysing the available data, EDF stated "This is not an emergency or an incident. It is a situation, that is covered by operating procedures, that is known and understood." However EDF said they were concerned about the French supplied fuel rods deteriorating further, and under regulations in France the reactor would be shut down to investigate why the fuel rods had lost their sealings, and perform necessary maintenance.

On 30 July 2021, the plant operator (CGNPC) reported that they have shutdown Taishan Unit 1 for maintenance after lengthy talks with relevant technicians. Engineers would find the cause of the damage and replace the affected fuel rods. 
A restart date has yet to be advised.

On 16 August 2022, CGNPC reported that Taishan Unit 1 has completed maintenance and was connected to the grid on 15 August 2022.

Reactor data
The Taishan Nuclear Power Plant Phase I consists of two reactors: both reactors are in commercial operation. Its Phase II consists of adding two additional reactors.

See also

Nuclear power in China
List of commercial nuclear reactors#China

References

Nuclear power stations in China
Power stations in Guangdong
Nuclear power stations using EPR reactors
Électricité de France
2013 establishments in China
Buildings and structures under construction in China
Nuclear power stations with reactors under construction
Nuclear power stations with proposed reactors